The 2020 FireKeepers Casino 400 is a NASCAR Cup Series race that was originally scheduled to be held on June 7, 2020, at Michigan International Speedway in Brooklyn, Michigan, but moved to August 8, 2020, and to be held over 500 kilometers (312 miles), shortened by 44 laps from the original distance because of modified NASCAR rules for doubleheader races, one of three Cup Series events to be run under the doubleheader format. It was the 21st race of the 2020 NASCAR Cup Series season.

Report

Background

The race was held at Michigan International Speedway, a  moderate-banked D-shaped speedway located in Brooklyn, Michigan. The track is used primarily for NASCAR events. It is sometimes known as a "sister track" to Texas World Speedway, and was used as the basis of Auto Club Speedway. The track is owned by International Speedway Corporation. Michigan International Speedway is recognized as one of motorsports' premier facilities because of its wide racing surface and high banking (by open-wheel standards; the 18-degree banking is modest by stock car standards).

Entry list
 (R) denotes rookie driver.
 (i) denotes driver who are ineligible for series driver points.

Qualifying
Joey Logano was awarded the pole for the race as determined by a random draw.

Starting Lineup

Race

Stage Results

Stage One
Laps: 40

Stage Two
Laps: 45

Final Stage Results

Stage Three
Laps: 71

Race statistics
 Lead changes: 12 among 7 different drivers
 Cautions/Laps: 9 for 43
 Red flags: 1 for 5 minutes and 45 seconds
 Time of race: 2 hours, 34 minutes and 55 seconds
 Average speed:

Media

Television
NBC Sports covered the race on the television side. Rick Allen, Jeff Burton, Steve Letarte and two-time Michigan winner, Dale Earnhardt Jr. covered the race from the booth at Charlotte Motor Speedway. Marty Snider and Kelli Stavast handled the pit road duties on site.

Radio
Radio coverage of the race was broadcast by Motor Racing Network (MRN) and simulcast on Sirius XM NASCAR Radio. Alex Hayden and Jeff Striegle called the race in the booth while the field is racing on the front stretch. Dave Moody called the race from a billboard outside of turn 2 when the field is racing through turns 1 and 2. Kyle Rickey called the race from a platform outside of turn 3 when the field races through turns 3 and 4. Winston Kelley and Kim Coon worked pit road for the radio side.

Standings after the race

Drivers' Championship standings

Manufacturers' Championship standings

Note: Only the first 16 positions are included for the driver standings.
. – Driver has clinched a position in the NASCAR Cup Series playoffs.

References

FireKeepers Casino 400
FireKeepers Casino 400
NASCAR races at Michigan International Speedway
FireKeepers Casino 400